Jan Carel Juta (23 March 1824 – 7 April 1886) was a Dutch-South African publisher, bookseller and brother-in-law of Karl Marx.

He was born in Zaltbommel, Netherlands. He married his wife Louise Juta on 5 June 1853 in a civil ceremony in Trier, Germany.

Jan Carel and Louise had seven children, including the future Sir Henry Juta QC, a barrister and senior Judge in the South African courts, who also served as Speaker of the Parliament of Cape Colony.

Juta died on 7 April 1886 in Chiswick, London.

Juta Publishing is still trading, and is one of South Africa's leading academic and law publishers.

References 

1824 births
1886 deaths
Dutch publishers (people)